Ruqayya bint ʿAlī was a daughter of the fourth caliph Ali ibn Abi Talib. She is considered an Alid saint (a ), her mother is Al-Sahba bint Rabi'a. She is claimed to be a full-sister of Abbas ibn Ali on a name plate (shown in the image on the right) in her mashhad (shrine) in Cairo, where she is traditionally considered to be a patron saint. Her shrine in Cairo is still used as an oratory where vows and intercessionary prayers to her are offered.

She is believed to have died when she was a child.

There is also a shrine in Lahore (Pakistan) called Bibi Pak Daman (Urdu: بی بی پاکدامن Bībī Pāk Dāman) which locals believe to be the mausoleum of Ruqayya bint Ali.

See also
 Muslim ibn Aqil
 Muhammad ibn Muslim and Ibrahim ibn Muslim
 Sayyida Nafisa bint al-Hasan
 Sayyida Ruqayya bint al-Husayn
 Sayyida Zaynab bint Ali

References

Arab women
Children of Ali
7th-century Arabs